Schizogyne sericea is a species of flowering plant in the family Asteraceae. It is native to Madeira and the Canary Islands.

References

Inuleae
Flora of the Canary Islands
Flora of Madeira